is a female Japanese manga writer. In the west she is mostly known for writing the manga Desert Coral.

Profile
In the past she worked for Mag Garden's Monthly Comic Blade up until September 2006. Following that she became pregnant in September 2006, and the change in her condition caused Junkyard Magnetic'''s serialization to go on temporary hiatus. She delivered without complications on December 2006, and then finished Junkyard Magnetic''.

Manga list
Desert Coral (Monthly Comic Blade, 5 volumes)
Junkyard Magnetic (Monthly Comic Blade, 6 volumes)
Hakaishin Ruruko (Monthly Comic Blade, 1 volume)
Fukigen Cinderella (Dengeki Comic Japan, 1 volume)
Hankyū Densha (Original novel by Hiro Arikawa, Wataru did the manga)

References

External links
  
  at Mag Garden 
 Official blog 
 

Manga artists
Living people
Year of birth missing (living people)